Maruschka Waldus (born 20 September 1992) is a Dutch football player who currently plays for Adelaide United in Australia.

She made her debut in May 2015 in the NWSL, being the first Dutch soccer player in the NWSL.
Together with Marlous Pieëte, Maruschka Waldus in 2017 was the first Dutch soccer player to play in the W-League in Australia.

Career 
Waldus was a two-time member of the KNVB Talent Team (2009 and 2010) in Amsterdam and attended the Johan Cruyff Academy in the Netherlands.

In 2011, she played three seasons for the soccer club SC Heerenveen near her home town, first in the Eredivisie, which changed later to the BeNe League. She was named to the women's first team for three consecutive seasons and was team captain in each of the last two seasons. She scored nine goals during her career at Heerenveen, including six in 2013.

In August 2014 Waldus came to the Alabama Crimson Tide of the University of Alabama USA, as a senior, and made an immediate impact early in the season on the defensive side of the ball. About halfway through the season, she became a defensive midfielder. She started and played in all 20 games of the season and scored three goals.

In 2015 Waldus earned a spot on the roster of Sky Blue FC. In the summer of 2015 she signed a contract in Sweden with Mallbackens IF, which plays in Damallsvenskan, the highest division, for the rest of the season.

In January 2016 she signed for the German side Turbine Potsdam, where she played the second half of the 2015–2016 season. At the end of the season she moved from Germany to the Netherlands to the champion of the Dutch first Division FC Twente. After playing three games in the qualifying round of the UEFA Women's Champions League, FC Twente was placed for the first round, in which they encountered Sparta Praha from Czech Republic (2–0 win at home and 1–3 win at Praha). In the second round they had to play Barcelona. After a 1–0 loss in Barcelona, FC Twente had chances in the home game, but FC Barcelona scored the goals: 0–4. Statistics of the home game 
Fc Twente ended second this season.

In July 2017 in Iceland the competition was halfway. Fylkir from Reykyavik was the next club that asked her to come over to Iceland to play in the Icelandic competition: Úrvalsdeild. The coach was Hermann Hreiðarsson who played in the national team and in the Premier League in England.

In September 2017, Waldus joined Australian club Western Sydney Wanderers, together with fellow countrywoman Marlous Pieëte. The competition, the W-League, ended in February 2018.

In March 2018 Waldus signed a contract with Avaldsnes Idrettslag in Norway playing the Toppserien and in the UEFA Women's Champions League. After a few games she became captain of the team. In the UEFA Women's Champions League, after playing a qualifying round in Kroatia, they encountered winner of the 2017-2018 edition Olympique Lyonnais Féminin. In Norway, in Haugesund after the first half 0-0 they lost with 0-2 and in Lyon the result was 5–0 in favour of Olympique Lyonnais Féminin. In the Norwegian competition Toppserien Avaldsnes Idrettslag ended 9 out of 12 participating teams.

In November 2018 after the end of the Norwegian Season Maruschka continued her career in Australia and went to play for the second season in a row for Western Sydney Wanderers for the 2018–19 W-League season.
The Australian women soccer season runs from September until February. After the season in the US and Scandinavia has ended. So you will find a lot of players of the US, Australia and Scandinavia who play a double season. That is why the Australian competition is a strong competition with great players as Sam Kerr, Lo'eau LaBonta, Elise Kellond-Knight and Lisa De Vanna.

In March 2019 The Flying Dutchman  or The Happy Soccer Nomad  returned to Norway and signed a two-year contract with Vålerenga IF to play in the Toppserien. At Vålerenga IF she met for third time in her career Frysian and Dutch soccer player Sherida Spitse. In 2019 Vålerenga IF ended second in the national competition, the Toppserien. They also reached the final of the Norwegian Women's Cup, in which they lost from LSK Kvinner. 2019 was the best season of Vålerenga IF up to now.
Maruschka Waldus (defense: central back), Sherida Spitse (midfield: central) and Ajara Nchout (attack: right wing) of Vålerenga IF were selected in the Team Of The Year 2019, the best eleven players, of the Toppserien.

2020. This year was the best year ever for Vålerenga IF, they won the Norwegian competition, Toppserien, and they also won the Norwegian Women's Cup. 

In January 2021, she joined Adelaide United FC (W-League) in Australia in the W-League (Australia). Adelaide United played their best season ever and ended fifth in the regular competition. They missed the finals by one goal. Maruschka was voted Player of the Year of Adelaide United and received the Alagich Vidmar award.

In May 2021, after the end of the Australian season, Waldus joined Dutch club PSV, signing a two-season contract. However, Adelaide United wanted her back after 1 year and bought out her contract in August 2022.

References

External links 
 :  Teams, games played, minutes played, yellow cards, goals scored etc.
Profile of Maruschka Waldus at Alabama University – www.rolltide.com
Maruschka Waldus – Avaldsnes and FC Twente, UEFA Champions League 2016–2017-2018
79' – Winning Goal Maruschka Waldus. 5 Oct. 2016 FC Twente Vrouwen – Sparta Praag 1 – 0
Interview TV Oost Mary Kok Willemse 5 Oct. 2016 Interview TV Oost Mary Kok Willemse
Highlights – Central Defender Maruschka Waldus Fc Twente 2016–2017
Highlights – Defensive Midfielder Maruschka Waldus Crimson Tide Alabama 2014
 Interview READY FOR MADDY 13 Oct. 2021 #6: globetrotter MARUSCHKA WALDUS 🇳🇱

1992 births
Living people
Dutch women's footballers
Eredivisie (women) players
National Women's Soccer League players
NJ/NY Gotham FC players
Women's association football defenders
Damallsvenskan players
Mallbackens IF players
Dutch expatriate sportspeople in Sweden
Expatriate women's footballers in Sweden
Alabama Crimson Tide women's soccer players
SC Heerenveen (women) players
Expatriate women's soccer players in the United States
Dutch expatriate sportspeople in the United States
Sportspeople from Heerenveen
1. FFC Turbine Potsdam players
Dutch expatriate sportspeople in Germany
Expatriate women's footballers in Germany
FC Twente (women) players
Western Sydney Wanderers FC (A-League Women) players
Adelaide United FC (A-League Women) players
PSV (women) players
A-League Women players
Dutch expatriate sportspeople in Australia
Dutch expatriate women's footballers
Dutch expatriate sportspeople in Iceland
Dutch expatriate sportspeople in Norway
Expatriate women's footballers in Iceland
Expatriate women's footballers in Norway
Footballers from Friesland
21st-century Dutch women